John McIvor "Jack" Hamilton (June 2, 1925 – March 20, 1994) was a Canadian ice hockey player who played 102 games in the National Hockey League between 1943 and 1946. The rest of his career, which lasted from 1941 to 1958, was spent in various minor leagues.

Career statistics

Regular season and playoffs

External links
 

1925 births
1994 deaths
Canadian ice hockey left wingers
Ice hockey people from Ontario
New Westminster Royals players
Ontario Hockey Association Senior A League (1890–1979) players
People from Quinte West
Pittsburgh Hornets players
Providence Reds players
Shawinigan-Falls Cataracts (QSHL) players
St. Louis Flyers players
Toronto Maple Leafs players
Toronto Young Rangers players
Troy Bruins players